Carlos Chaile (born 14 January 1975 in Bella Vista in Tucumán Province) is an Argentine football player, currently playing for Austrian team.

In Argentina, Chaile played with Ferro Carril Oeste, Club Almagro, and Gimnasia y Tiro de Salta, before moving to Europe in 2001, to join St. Gallen in the Swiss Super League. In 2003, he was signed by Austrian club FC Superfund. His contract with the team is valid until 2007. He last played for SK Austria Kärnten.

External links
 Statistics at Irish Times
 Carlos Chaile at BDFA.com.ar 
 Carlos Chaile – Argentine Primera statistics at Fútbol XXI 

1975 births
Living people
Sportspeople from Tucumán Province
Association football defenders
Argentine footballers
Argentine expatriate footballers
Gimnasia y Tiro footballers
Ferro Carril Oeste footballers
Club Almagro players
FC St. Gallen players
Expatriate footballers in Austria
Argentina youth international footballers